Dorothy Hinshaw Patent (born April 30, 1940) is a teacher and author of over 100 children's nonfiction books. She lives in Missoula, Montana.

In 1964 she married Greg Patent.

Awards 
She has received numerous awards for her writing.  "In 1987, she received the Eva L. Gordon Award from the American Nature Study Society in recognition of her outstanding contribution to science literature for young readers." She received the Washington Post/Children's Book Guild 2004 Nonfiction Award.

References

External links 
 Works by Dorothy Hinshaw Patent at Library Thing
 

1940 births
American children's writers
American nature writers
Writers from Montana
Living people
American women children's writers
Women science writers
American women non-fiction writers
21st-century American women
People from Rochester, Minnesota
Stanford University alumni
University of California, Berkeley alumni